Le Buisson may refer to several communes in France:

 Le Buisson, former commune of the Calvados department, now part of Merville-Franceville-Plage 
 Le Buisson, former commune of the Dordogne department, now part of Le Buisson-de-Cadouin
 Le Buisson, Lozère, in the Lozère department
 Le Buisson, Marne, in the Marne department
 Le Buisson-de-Cadouin, in the Dordogne department

See also
 Buisson (disambiguation)